The Communist Party of Bolivia (Marxist-Leninist-Maoist) (PCB-MLM) is a Marxist–Leninist–Maoist communist party in Bolivia. When the Communist Party of Bolivia (Marxist–Leninist) (PCB-ML) broke with Maoism in 1983 and became Hoxhaist, a small group split from it and founded a new party with the same name. In 2004 it was renamed to its current name.

The PCB-MLM supported the government of Evo Morales.

It publishes Liberación since 1993.

See also
Communist Party of Bolivia
Communist Party of Bolivia (Marxist–Leninist)
People's Revolutionary Front (Marxist−Leninist−Maoist)

References

1983 establishments in Bolivia
Communist parties in Bolivia
Far-left politics in Bolivia
International Conference of Marxist–Leninist Parties and Organizations (International Newsletter)
International Coordination of Revolutionary Parties and Organizations
Maoism in South America
Maoist parties
Political parties established in 1983
Political parties in Bolivia